Dosage forms (also called unit doses) are pharmaceutical drug products in the form in which they are marketed for use, with a specific mixture of active ingredients and inactive components (excipients), in a particular configuration (such as a capsule shell, for example), and apportioned into a particular dose. For example, two products may both be amoxicillin, but one is in 500 mg capsules and another is in 250 mg chewable tablets. The term unit dose can also sometimes encompass non-reusable packaging as well (especially when each drug product is individually packaged), although the FDA distinguishes that by unit-dose "packaging" or "dispensing". Depending on the context, multi(ple) unit dose can refer to distinct drug products packaged together, or to a single drug product containing multiple drugs and/or doses. The term dosage form can also sometimes refer only to the pharmaceutical formulation of a drug product's constituent drug substance(s) and any blends involved, without considering matters beyond that (like how it is ultimately configured as a consumable product such as a capsule, patch, etc.). Because of the somewhat vague boundaries and unclear overlap of these terms and certain variants and qualifiers within the pharmaceutical industry, caution is often advisable when conversing with someone who may be unfamiliar with another person's use of the term.

Depending on the method/route of administration, dosage forms come in several types. These include many kinds of liquid, solid, and semisolid dosage forms. Common dosage forms include pill, tablet, or capsule, drink or syrup, among many others. 

When one drug product (for example, one tablet, one capsule, one syrup) contains more than one drug (more than one active ingredient), that product is a combination drug (fixed-dose combination; FDC). 

In naturopathy, dosages can take the form of decoctions and herbal teas, as well as the more conventional methods previously mentioned. 

The route of administration (ROA) for drug delivery is dependent on the dosage form of the substance in question. Various dosage forms may exist for a single particular drug, since some medical conditions such as being unconscious can restrict ROA. For example, persistent nausea, especially with vomiting, may make it difficult to use an oral dosage form, and in such a case, it may be necessary to use an alternative route such as inhalational, buccal, sublingual, nasal, suppository or parenteral instead. Additionally, a specific dosage form may be a requirement for certain kinds of drugs, as there may be issues with various factors like chemical stability or pharmacokinetics. As an example, insulin cannot be given orally because upon being administered in this manner, it is extensively metabolized in the gastrointestinal tract (GIT) before reaching the blood stream, and is thereby incapable of sufficiently reaching its therapeutic target destinations. The oral and intravenous doses of a drug such as paracetamol will differ for the same reason.

Oral 

 Pills, i.e. tablets or capsules
 Liquids such as syrups, solutions, elixers, emulsions, and tinctures
 Liquids such as decoctions and herbal teas
 Orally disintegrating tablets
 Lozenges or candy (electuaries)
 Thin films (e.g., Listerine Pocketpaks, nitroglycerin) to be placed on top of or underneath the tongue as well as against the cheek
 Powders or effervescent powder or tablets, often instructed to be mixed into a food item
 Plants or seeds prepared in various ways such as a cannabis edible
 Pastes such as high fluoride toothpastes
 Gases such as oxygen (can also be delivered through the nose)

Ophthalmic 

 Eye drops 
 Lotions
 Ointments 
 Emulsions

Inhalation 
 Aerosolized medication
 Dry-powder Inhalers or metered dose inhalers
 Nebulizer-administered medication
 Smoking
 Vaporizer-administered medication

Unintended ingredients 
Talc is an excipient often used in pharmaceutical tablets that may end up being crushed to a powder against medical advice or for recreational use. Also, illicit drugs that occur as white powder in their pure form are often cut with cheap talc. Natural talc is cheap but contains asbestos while asbestos-free talc is more expensive. Inhaled talc that has asbestos is generally accepted as being able to cause lung cancer if it is inhaled. The evidence about asbestos-free talc is less clear, according to the American Cancer Society.

Injection

Parenteral 
 Intradermally-administered (ID)
 Subcutaneously-administered (SC)
 Intramuscularly-administered (IM)
 Intraosseous administration (IO)
 Intraperitoneally-administered (IP)
 intravenously-administered (IV)
 Intracavernously-administered (ICI)

These are usually solutions and suspensions.

Unintended ingredients

Safe 
Eye drops (normal saline in disposable packages) are distributed to syringe users by needle exchange programs.

Unsafe 
The injection of talc from crushed pills has been associated with pulmonary talcosis in intravenous drug users.

Topical 
 Creams, liniments, balms (such as lip balm or antiperspirants and deodorants), lotions, or ointments, etc.
 Gels and hydrogels 
 Ear drops
 Transdermal and dermal patches to be applied to the skin
 Powders

Unintended use
 It is not safe to calculate divided doses by cutting and weighing medical skin patches, because there's no guarantee that the substance is evenly distributed on the patch surface. For example, fentanyl transdermal patches are designed to slowly release the substance over 3 days. It is well known that cut fentanyl transdermal consumed orally have cause overdoses and deaths.
 Single blotting papers for illicit drugs injected from solvents in syringes may also cause uneven distribution across the surface.

Other 
 Intravaginal administration
 Vaginal rings
 Capsules and tablets
 Suppositories
 Rectal administration (enteral)
 Suppositories
 Suspensions and solutions in the form of enemas
 Gels
 Urethral
 Nasal sprays

See also
 Classification of Pharmaco-Therapeutic Referrals
 Drug delivery
 Route of administration
 Pharmaceutical packaging

References

External links

Dosage From Development

 
Pharmacokinetics